Dragan Lukač (born 1968) is a Bosnian politician serving as Minister of Interior of Republika Srpska for the Alliance of Independent Social Democrats since 2014. He is a former colonel of Police of Republika Srpska and commander of Special Brigade of Police and Sixth Detachment of Special Brigade of Police during the Bosnian War.

Biography 
Dragan Lukač was born in 1968 in Krnjeuša, Bosanski Petrovac, where he graduated elementary school. Later he graduated from technical high school in Bihać and after that, he continued his education in Banja Luka on High school of Internal Affairs and later on College of Internal Affairs. After graduating from college, he became the magister of state-law sciences.

During his working period, he worked in Secretariat of Internal Affairs of Socialist Republic of Bosnia and Herzegovina in Center of Security Service in Sarajevo and Bihać. During wartime period he was commander of Sixth Detachment of Special Brigade of Police as colonel. Dragan Lukač is decorated with the Order of Miloš Obilić and the Order of Karađorđe Star for his successful command of units during war.

After the war, he was commander of the Special Brigade and he worked in the Ministry of Interior till 2005. After that, he worked in Banja Luka City Administration as the chief of Department of Municipal Police.

He was member of the second Government cabinet of Željka Cvijanović when he first time became Minister of Interior (after the 2014 Republika Srpska general election) and he is a member of the entity Government of Radovan Višković (after the 2018 Republika Srpska general election).

In December 2018, thousands of protesters called for Lukač's resignation and against his re-appointment as RS interior minister, deeming him responsible of the cover-up of the Death of David Dragičević. The protest was dispersed and several persons were detained. Lukač also sued Dragicevic's father, Davor, for allegedly "jeopardizing the security of the Interior Minister". The investigation was discontinued three years later, in September 2021.

Decorations

National decorations 
  Order of Miloš Obilić
  Order of Karađorđe Star

See also 
 Government of Republika Srpska
 Ministry of Interior (Republika Srpska)
 Police of Republika Srpska
 Special Anti-Terrorist Unit (Republika Srpska)

References 

Living people
1968 births
Republika Srpska
Politics of Republika Srpska
Politicians of Republika Srpska
Police of Republika Srpska
People from Bosanski Petrovac
Serbs of Bosnia and Herzegovina